Kınık can refer to:

 Kınık, district of İzmir Province of Turkey
 Kınık, Akçakoca
 Kınık, Çorum
 Kınık, İnegöl
 Kınık, İvrindi, a village in Turkey
 Kınık, Sındırgı, a village
 Kınık, Tosya, a village in Turkey
 Kınık (tribe), an Oghuz Turkic tribe